Joette Hayashigawa is an American author and playwright. Her works include: The Eleventh Anniversary of the Butcher and His Wife.  She is also a past winner of the Dana Award for the Novel.

She lives in Vermont.

Notes

20th-century American novelists
American women novelists
American novelists of Asian descent
Living people
Year of birth missing (living people)
Place of birth missing (living people)
American dramatists and playwrights of Japanese descent
American women dramatists and playwrights
20th-century American women writers
20th-century American dramatists and playwrights
21st-century American women